Mónica Estarreado (born 29 June 1975, in Madrid, Spain) is a Spanish actress. She is best known for her role as Cayetana de la Vega on the popular Spanish comedy-drama Yo soy Bea and for her current role as Dr. Valeria Peralta on Hospital Central, as well as for her work as Fatima Mansour in La Reina del Sur, the latter of which made her known in the United States, Mexico, Puerto Rico, Serbia, Chile and other countries.

Personal life
On 28 September 2007, she married Luis Arribas, an assistant director on Yo soy Bea. In February 2011, it was announced they are expecting their first child. In July, she gave birth to a baby girl.

Filmography

Film
 Palace (1996)
 Año cero (2001)
 Al alcance de su mano (2002)
 En la ciudad sin límites (2002)
 Más de mil cámaras velan por tu seguridad (2003)
 Válido para un baile (2006)

Television
 El súper (1996-1999) as Leticia Torres
 Calle nueva (1999-2000)
 Al salir de clase (2000) as Bárbara
 Paraíso (2000)
 La verdad de Laura (2001-2002) as Laura Alonso
 De moda (2004)
 Siete vidas (2005)
 A tortas con la vida (2005)
 El comisario (2006) 
 Yo soy Bea (2006-2008) as Cayetana de la Vega
 Hospital Central (2009-2011) as Valeria Peralta
 La Reina del Sur (2011) as Fátima Mansour
 Aquí Paz y después Gloria (2015) as Paz.

External links

References 

1975 births
Living people
Actresses from Madrid
Spanish television actresses
Spanish film actresses